Fargniers is a district of the commune (municipality) of Tergnier located in the French department of Aisne. A former independent municipality, Fargniers was absorbed by Tergnier in 1973. Its population is 3,391 (2019). Destroyed for 95% in the First World War, it was reconstructed in the 1920s with support from the Carnegie Endowment. The civil buildings (town hall, community hall, post office, kindergarten, girls' school, boys' school) lining the central square, Place Carnegie, have been listed as historic monuments.

References

Former communes of Aisne